Duncan Page (born 29 October 1934) is an Australian modern pentathlete and fencer who competed at the 1964 and 1968 Summer Olympics.

References

1934 births
Living people
Australian male fencers
Australian male modern pentathletes
Olympic fencers of Australia
Olympic modern pentathletes of Australia
Fencers at the 1968 Summer Olympics
Modern pentathletes at the 1964 Summer Olympics
Modern pentathletes at the 1968 Summer Olympics